I've Married A Bachelor is an Australian television sitcom that first screened on the ABC in 1968. It won the Logie Award for Best Comedy at the Logie Awards of 1968.

Cast
 Peter Whitford as Peter Prentiss
 June Thody as Molly Prentiss
 Donald McDonald as Mervyn MacGregor
 Aileen Britton as Mrs. Malley 
 Don Philps as Mr. Malley

See also
 List of Australian television series
 Newlyweds

References

External links
 
 I've Married A Bachelor at Classic Television Australia

1968 Australian television series debuts
1969 Australian television series endings
Australian television sitcoms
Australian Broadcasting Corporation original programming
Black-and-white Australian television shows
English-language television shows